Taki is a city and a municipality under the Hasnabad police station of the Basirhat subdivision in North 24 Parganas district in the Indian state of West Bengal.

Geography

location
It has an average elevation of 5 metres (16 feet) at the bank of Ichamati River.

Area overview
The area shown in the map is a part of the Ichhamati-Raimangal Plain, located in the lower Ganges Delta. It contains soil of mature black or brownish loam to recent alluvium. Numerous rivers, creeks and khals criss-cross the area. The tip of the Sundarbans National Park is visible in the lower part of the map (shown in green but not marked). The larger full screen map shows the full forest area. A large section of the area is a part of the Sundarbans settlements. The densely populated area is an overwhelmingly rural area. Only 12.96% of the population lives in the urban areas and 87.04% of the population lives in the rural areas.

Note: The map alongside presents some of the notable locations in the subdivision. All places marked in the map are linked in the larger full screen map.

Demographics
According to the 2011 Census of India, Taki had a total population of 38,263, of which 19,562 (51%) were males and 18,701 (49%) were females. Population in the age range 0–6 years was 3,419. The total number of literate persons in Taki was 28,939 (83.05% of the population over 6 years).

 India census, Taki had a population of 37,302. Males constitute 53% of the population and females 47%. Taki has an average literacy rate of 68%, higher than the national average of 59.5%: male literacy is 73%, and female literacy is 61%. In Taki, 10% of the population is under 6 years of age.

Culture and education

There are a Library (Taki District Library) and a college named Taki Government College situated in Taki town. Taki Government High School, is the oldest school of this area. Other renowned schools like Taki S. L. Girls High School and Taki Bhabanath High School are there. Ramakrishna Mission also established a branch with Taki Ramakrishna Mission High School and hostel facilities in Taki.

Taki is known for its sweets called "Chhanar Malpoa". Other than local Kali Puja, Durga Puja, etc. this place became a tourist picnic spot beside the Ichamati river due to the international border between India and Bangladesh.

Taki Government College was established in 1950. Affiliated to the West Bengal State University, it offers honours courses in Bengali, English, Sanskrit, history, philosophy, political science, economics, geography, mathematics, chemistry, physics, botany and zoology, and a post-graduate course in Bengali.

Transport
Taki Road railway station is on the Barasat-Hasnabad line, which is part of the Kolkata Suburban Railway system.

State Highway 2 passes through Taki.

Healthcare
Taki Rural Hospital at Taki with 50 beds functions as the main medical facility in Hasnabad CD Block. There are primary health centres at Bhurkundu (Bhawanipur PHC with10 beds), Bhebia (Ghola PHC with 6 beds) and Bara Bankra (Barunhat PHC with 10).

Personalities
 Ashoke Kumar Sen, Independent India's first law minister
 Shankar Roychowdhury, General of Indian Army
 Gautam Deb, former minister

Gallery Of Taki

References

External links
 A site with information on Taki
 Taki travel information

Cities and towns in North 24 Parganas district
Cities in West Bengal